Richard Muagututia (born 7 January 1988) is a Samoan rugby union player
 He has one cap for Samoa, making his début against Japan.

During 2012, it was announced that Richard would leave Worcester Warriors after one season.  Richard had not played as much as he wanted, when he suffered a broken cheek bone in the middle of the season.

He plays as a number eight.

References

External links 
 Worcester Warriors profile

1988 births
Living people
Worcester Warriors players
Rugby union number eights